Megalopyge radiata is a moth of the Megalopygidae family. It was described by Schaus in 1892. It is found in Mexico and Brazil.

The wingspan is 54 mm. Adults are brown, the basal half of the forewings below the median vein much darker and outwardly bordered with white, where white lines extend towards the outer margin. At the end of the cell is a large velvety brown spot and beyond the cell white lines radiate towards the apex and outer margin. The hindwings are brown.

References

Moths described in 1892
Megalopygidae